Hocuspocus is a 1966 West German comedy film directed by Kurt Hoffmann and starring Heinz Rühmann, Liselotte Pulver, and Fritz Tillmann. It is based on the 1926 play by Curt Goetz, which had previously been adapted into several film versions, Hocuspocus (1930 film) (with a parallel version in English), and Hocuspocus (1953 film) with Goetz himself.

The film's sets were designed by the art director Otto Pischinger. It was shot at the Spandau Studios in Berlin.

Cast

References

Bibliography

External links 
 

1966 films
1966 comedy films
German comedy films
West German films
1960s German-language films
Films directed by Kurt Hoffmann
German films based on plays
Films based on works by Curt Goetz
Remakes of German films
German courtroom films
Films about fictional painters
Constantin Film films
Films shot at Spandau Studios
1960s German films